The 2021–22 season was the 116th season in the existence of Sporting CP and the club's 88th consecutive season in the top flight of Portuguese football. In addition to the domestic league, Sporting CP participated in this season's editions of the Taça de Portugal, the Taça da Liga, the Supertaça Cândido de Oliveira and the UEFA Champions League.

Players

First-team squad

Other players under contract

Out on loan

Transfers

In

Total Spending = €14,000,000

Out

Pre-season and friendlies

Competitions

Overall record

Primeira Liga

League table

Results summary

Results by round

Matches

Taça de Portugal

Taça da Liga

Third round

Semi-finals

Final

Supertaça Cândido de Oliveira

UEFA Champions League

Group stage

The draw for the group stage was held on 26 August 2021.

Knockout phase

Round of 16
The draw for the round of 16 was held on 13 December 2021.

Statistics

Appearances and goals

|-
!colspan=16 style=background:#dcdcdc; text-align:center|Goalkeepers

|-
!colspan=16 style=background:#dcdcdc; text-align:center|Defenders

|-
!colspan=16 style=background:#dcdcdc; text-align:center|Midfielders

|-
!colspan=16 style=background:#dcdcdc; text-align:center|Forwards

|-
!colspan=16 style=background:#dcdcdc; text-align:center|Players who have made an appearance this season but have left the club

Goalscorers

References

Sporting CP seasons
Sporting CP
Sporting CP